Bowscale is a hamlet and former civil parish, now in the parish of Mungrisdale, in the Eden district, in the county of Cumbria, England. In 1931 the parish had a population of 27. The sable tarn in Sir Walter Scott's poem The Bridal of Triermain was reportedly based on Bowscale Tarn.

History 
Bowscale was formerly a township in Greystoke parish, from 1866 Bowscale was a civil parish in its own right until it was abolished on 1 April 1934 and merged with Mungrisdale,  which is made up of eight hamlets and had a population of 297 in the 2011 United Kingdom census.

References

External links
  Cumbria County History Trust: Bowscale (nb: provisional research only - see Talk page)

Hamlets in Cumbria
Former civil parishes in Cumbria
Mungrisdale